Parliamentary elections were held in Andorra on 31 August 1933, the first held under universal male suffrage. The extension of the franchise to all men over 21 followed social unrest referred to as the Andorran Revolution. As political parties were not legalised until 1993, all candidates ran as independents.

Background
The elections, called by the co-princes, took place amid the occupation of the country by French gendarmes. The police had arrived after the General Council approved universal male suffrage - until then only the heads of household could vote - forced by the occupation of the Casa de la Vall on 5 April by the Young Andorrans. The Tribunal de Corts subsequently dismissed the General Council elected in 1932. Faced with the Council's resistance to dissolution, however, the co-princes sent a contingent of gendarmes to Andorra on 19 August and ordered the elections to be held on 31 August.

Census

Results 
The interpretation of the results is complicated because there were no formal political parties, instead councilors were linked to groups that could vary in opinion. The day after the elections, the press reported 14 seats had been won by the Integral Nationalist Group (GNI), conservative supporters of the co-princes; five seats had been won by the Andorran Union (UA), supporters of the deposed General Council, and four had been won by socialists. However, an undated document from the Permanent Delegation French also registered a majority of "anti-episcopal" councilors unfavorable to the co-princes.

Elected members
The official results were communicated by the Consul General of Canillo to the French veguer.

Notes

References

Andorra
Parliamentary election
Parliamentary elections in Andorra
Non-partisan elections
August 1933 events